Apalotacarus is a genus of mites belonging to the family Canestrinidae.

Species:

Apalotacarus aristatus 
Apalotacarus trullus

References

Acari